Holding It Down: The Veterans' Dreams Project is a collaborative studio album by American jazz pianist Vijay Iyer and American hip hop musician Mike Ladd. It was released on Pi Recordings in 2013.

Critical reception

Daniel Paton of MusicOMH gave the album 4.5 out of 5 stars, calling it "compelling and beautiful; troubling and moving in equal measure." Mike Hobart of Financial Times gave the album 4 out of 5 stars, writing, "Each track is stalked by the fear, guilt and surrealism of the post-traumatic dreams that were culled from scores of interviews."

Track listing

Personnel
Credits adapted from liner notes.

 Vijay Iyer – piano, electric piano, electronics, production, programming, liner notes
 Mike Ladd – vocals, analogue synthesizer, liner notes
 Maurice Decaul – vocals
 Lynn Hill – vocals
 Pamela Z – vocals
 Guillermo E. Brown – vocals, effects
 Liberty Ellman – guitar, mixing
 Okkyung Lee – cello
 Kassa Overall – drums

References

External links
 

2013 albums
Collaborative albums
Vijay Iyer albums
Mike Ladd albums
Pi Recordings albums